Sodasa Linga Mandapas are Hindu temples dedicated to the deity Shiva, the mandapas or temples found around the Mahamaham Tank in Kumbakonam in Thanjavur district, Tamil Nadu, India.

Sodasa
Sodasa refers to sixteen.

16 Mandapas

 
These 16 mandapas are devoted to Brammatheerthesvarar, Mukundesvarar, Dhanesvarar, Virushabesvarar, Baanesvarar, Konesvarar, Bhakthikesvarar, Bhairavesvarar,  Agasthisvarar, Vyasakesvarar, Umabakevarar, Nirutheesvarar, Brammesvarar, Gangathesvarar, Mukthatheerthesvarar and Shethrabalesvarar. They were represented by the lingam. Govinda Dikshitar, the chieftain of Ragunatha Nayak of Thanjavur, constructed the sixteen Mandapams and stone steps around this tank.

Of the mandapas, in the biggest one, the sculpture of offering of gold by Ragunatha Nayak is found. In other mandapas sculptures pertaining to the respective grants are found.

Directions
Around the Mahamaham tank, these mandapas are found in all directions, except south. These mandapas are under the administration of Kasi Visvanathar Temple.

Kumbhabhishekham
These mandapas are also called as Sodasa (16) Mahalingas. Kumbhabhishekham to these mandapas were held on 29 November 2015.

See also
 Mamankam festival

Reference

External links
 Kasi Viswanathar Temple
 2016 Mahamaham
 Mahamaham 2016
Mahamaham 2016 Celebrations
Mahamaham festival

Sodasa mandapas

Hindu temples in Thanjavur district
Shiva temples in Thanjavur district